Wilfred Stanley Bird (28 September 1883 – 9 May 1915) was an English cricketer. He played 55 first-class matches for Middlesex and Oxford University between 1904 and 1913. He was killed in action during World War I.

See also
 List of Middlesex County Cricket Club players
 List of cricketers who were killed during military service

References

External links
 

1883 births
1915 deaths
English cricketers
Middlesex cricketers
Oxford University cricketers
Cricketers from Greater London
Alumni of New College, Oxford
King's Royal Rifle Corps officers
British military personnel killed in World War I
Marylebone Cricket Club cricketers
Gentlemen cricketers
North v South cricketers
C. I. Thornton's XI cricketers
Lord Londesborough's XI cricketers
British Army personnel of World War I